HAL Airport  is an airport that serves Bangalore, the capital of the Indian state of Karnataka. Located about 12 km east of the city centre, it has one runway and operates 24/7. Hindustan Aeronautics Limited (HAL), a state-owned defence company, owns the airfield and runs a testing facility in conjunction with the Indian Armed Forces. The airport also caters to non-scheduled civilian traffic, including general, business and VIP aviation. For over 60 years, it received all domestic and international flights to the city; the Airports Authority of India shut down its civil enclave, officially known as Bangalore International Airport, upon the opening of the Kempegowda International Airport in Devanahalli in 2008.

The airport commenced operations in January 1941 as the home of India's first aircraft factory, established by the company Hindustan Aircraft. The Allies employed the airfield during the Second World War, and by 1946 commercial flights had begun. Activity at the airport grew gradually over the next several decades until the 1990s, when it started to increase rapidly in parallel to Bangalore's economic expansion. In response, the airport underwent a series of expansions and upgrades. Meanwhile, HAL declared it wanted the airport completely to itself, resulting in the planning of another airfield to replace the civil enclave. Although HAL later modified its stance and some residents of the city protested, an agreement between the new airport's operator and the state and national governments obligated the enclave to close. Consequently, airlines moved to the Devanahalli airport on the night of 23–24 May 2008.

History 
During World War II, Indian magnate Walchand Hirachand sought to build and repair planes in India, which at the time did not have any aircraft industry of its own. He found a partner in American businessman William Pawley, and the two received authorization from the British War Cabinet to set up a factory. Meanwhile, the princely state of Mysore offered 200 acres in Bangalore for the construction of an airfield. Hirachand, his colleagues, and the Mysore government jointly formed a company called Hindustan Aircraft Limited (the original name of present-day Hindustan Aeronautics Limited, or HAL) and in December 1940 laid the cornerstone of the facility, which began operations just one month later. The colonial government joined the venture in 1941. As fears of Japanese ambitions rose following the attack on Pearl Harbor, the British Raj took over HAL in April 1942, thereby requisitioning the airfield as well. It then allowed the US Tenth Air Force to repair its aircraft in Bangalore, and the following year the Americans began running the factory. With the US Air Force in charge, the facility focused on fixing and overhauling aircraft and engines, as well as producing drop tanks. Workers tended to a wide range of planes, including Catalinas and C-47 Dakotas. Upon the war's conclusion, the Indian government reassumed control of the airport.

On the civilian front, commercial flights had started by 1946, when Deccan Airways introduced service to Hyderabad. Six years later, three other airlines were also flying to the airport, linking it to a handful of destinations in South India. The national government then combined all domestic carriers into a single company called Indian Airlines, which was providing nonstop service from Bangalore to six cities by 1970. Additionally, jet aircraft had reached the airport by this time, with Caravelles performing routes to Hyderabad and Bombay. During the 1980–1981 fiscal year, the HAL airport served approximately 550,000 passengers. Before the end of the decade, Bangalore had acquired one more airline, Vayudoot, which operated flights within Karnataka as well as to neighbouring Tamil Nadu. Meanwhile, Indian Airlines' network from the city had expanded to 13 destinations, from Delhi in the north to Trivandrum in the south.

During the 1990s, Bangalore's rising global stature and bustling economy led passenger numbers at the HAL airport to rise at a quick rate. While 1,000 travellers were passing through the terminal daily in 1991, more than six times that number were doing so by 1997. Additionally, Air India delivered Bangalore its first international destination, Singapore, in January 1995. To keep pace with the growing civilian air traffic, the Airports Authority of India (AAI) constructed an instrument landing system for the runway and another terminal. The arrivals section of the two-storey building could serve 700 domestic and 300 international passengers at a time, while the departures area had a capacity for 300 international travellers. At the inauguration ceremony in January 1999, then Prime Minister Atal Bihari Vajpayee observed that the city's accelerated pace of growth meant that the expansion would only help in the short-term, so government leaders needed to work toward building a new airport.

Plans for another airport had originated earlier in the decade, when HAL conveyed that it no longer wished to share its airfield with commercial airlines. The company owned the land of the airport and managed all facilities besides the AAI's civil enclave. A group of private companies evinced interest in the new-airport project and signed a memorandum of understanding with the Karnataka government; the agreement specified that airline flights would switch to the new facility upon its inauguration. However, HAL later dropped its demand. The enterprise and the AAI divided the earnings from the civil enclave among themselves, and HAL feared the impact the closure would have on its revenue. While the union government supported HAL, the consortium insisted that the civil enclave would need to cease operations in order to ensure the new airport's profitability. State officials added that the lake, apartment complexes, and other buildings surrounding the HAL airport made it impossible to significantly expand the site to accommodate future growth in air traffic. Although the businesses ultimately decided to abandon the endeavour, it gradually moved forward.

The year 2000 saw the Bangalore airport land its first foreign carrier, Royal Nepal Airlines, which initiated a route to Kathmandu. One year later, Lufthansa launched flights to Frankfurt using Airbus A340s, signalling the first time the South Indian metropolis had a direct link to Europe.

Bangalore's IT and other industries continued to flourish, driving passenger counts further up as the decade progressed. Air Deccan established its first base at the HAL airport upon starting operations in 2003. Two years later, Bangalore ranked third on the list of the busiest airports in India with respect to domestic operations, and more international travellers were arriving as well. Carriers like British Airways and Air France, which began service to the city in the same week, contributed to this growth. In 2006, HAL complained that the booming civilian operations were hindering the company's activities, which ranged from flying sorties to evaluating aircraft prototypes. In fact, over the past fiscal year the airport had operated at about 1.6 times its capacity of 3.5 million passengers per year.

Meanwhile, a private company called Bangalore International Airport Limited (BIAL) signed a concession agreement with the state and national governments to erect a new, much larger airport. In 2005, BIAL started construction at a site 30 km from the downtown area of the city in the suburb of Devanahalli.  Similar to the memorandum that the original consortium had signed in the 1990s, the contract barred commercial flights from operating at the HAL airport for 25 years after the new airfield opened.

The large amount of traffic placed great strain on the HAL airport, creating congested terminals and overflowing parking lots. Additionally, since the tarmac had only eight parking stands for passenger aircraft, the high number of flights was producing delays. As the new airport would not be ready for another few years, the AAI attempted to improve the present situation in different ways. Worried about the dangers of a crowded airspace, officials requested domestic airlines to consider discontinuing the addition of flights and operating fewer services during the busiest hours. The airports authority also collaborated with HAL to construct extra parking bays, and by late 2006 it had finished enlarging the two terminals, thereby raising the yearly capacity by 800,000 people. The airport remained significantly busy in the meantime. 10 domestic airlines and 11 foreign carriers were serving it in 2007, and greater than 10 million passengers passed through the terminals in the 2007–2008 fiscal year. In April 2008, Air Mauritius added Bangalore's first route to Africa. Using Airbus A330 equipment, it flew to Port Louis via Chennai, while the return service was direct.

Transfer of civilian operations
As work on the new airport neared its end, a controversy grew in the city regarding the civil enclave's impending closure. Local business leaders and others claimed, for example, that the authorities were going to eliminate a potential competitor to BIAL. Even the managing director of HAL's Bangalore branch supported retaining some domestic flights, as he believed the immense demand for air travel made it sensible for the city to have two airports. At the same time, the defence company noted that keeping the passenger terminals open was not one of its primary concerns. Additionally, 20,000 AAI workers across India walked off their jobs in March 2008 over the shutting of the civil enclaves in Bangalore and Hyderabad; they did not end their strike until the union government affirmed that the airports would remain operational for other purposes. The Karnataka government suggested to BIAL that the HAL airport could continue receiving short-haul flights, but the company would not change its stance.

On 23 May 2008, the high court of the state rejected a petition by a local organisation to delay the new airport's opening, ensuring that the transfer of passenger and revenue cargo flights between the airfields would take place at midnight. Nevertheless, one plane did not take-off from the HAL airport until 1:30 am on 24 May, as rainy weather forced the incoming flight to land late. In light of the protests, the court offered the central government and BIAL 12 weeks to determine the future of the civil enclave. BIAL still sought to adhere to the 2004 agreement, and New Delhi concurred after assessing the Devanahalli airport's capabilities.

Since the last commercial flights took off, the level of activity at the HAL airport has decreased greatly. In 2015, between 60 and 70 aircraft movements occurred per day, a significant drop from 310 in 2007. Meanwhile, HAL has spoken various times with BIAL and the government in an effort to reopen the civil enclave and increase the airport's revenue. Although the defence ministry sided with HAL, BIAL remained opposed to amending the concession agreement for several years. In 2020, however, the company stated that once Kempegowda Airport was operating at maximum capacity, it would contemplate allowing passenger operations to resume at the HAL airport.

Facilities and operations 
HAL Airport has one asphalt runway, which is oriented to 90/270 degrees and measures 3,306 by 61 metres. It is equipped with a category I instrument landing system and can cater to aircraft as large as the Boeing 747. The airfield, which remains operational 24/7, also contains 30 parking spots and two helipads.

The airport accommodates a wide array of non-scheduled civilian operations, including VIP aircraft movements, charter flights, and air ambulances. However, it does not generally function as a diversion alternative to Kempegowda International Airport in case of emergencies; the AAI no longer maintains the terminal buildings to handle passengers, and no airline flight may touch down at the airfield per the concession agreement. As of 2017, the civil aviation ministry seeks to permit airlines to divert to the HAL airport, as it does not believe the contract with BIAL applies to such contingencies. In regards to facilities available for civilian use, the airport offers a VIP lounge, air-freight warehouse, and maintenance hangar. The closed civil enclave possessed two terminals, one for domestic flights and the other for international services.

With respect to defence activities, HAL and the Indian military perform test flights from the airfield.

Incidents and accidents 
On 15 September 1951, an Air India Douglas C-47 Dakota departed with the autopilot switched on, causing the plane to crash. Of the 27 people on board, one crew member died in the accident.
On 21 October 1963, a Fairchild C-119 Flying Boxcar belonging to the Indian Air Force collided with trees as it was preparing to land, killing eight of the 21 people aboard.
 14 February 1990: Indian Airlines Flight 605, an Airbus A320, crashed on final approach with 92 fatalities.
 28 December 1996: A Blue Dart Aviation Boeing 737 made a heavy, off-centre landing, causing damage to the aircraft and runway.
 12 February 2004: A helicopter being used by the HAL Rotary Wing Academy crashed, injuring both occupants.
 26 October 2005: An Indian Air Force MiG-21 crashed, killing the pilot.
 11 March 2006: A Deccan ATR 72 with 40 passengers and 4 crew members made a heavy landing. There were no major injuries, but the aircraft was written off.
 4 May 2006: A Transmile Air Services 727-2F2F suffered damage to the left-wing fuel tank.
 21 August 2006: A Kiran Mark II trainer aircraft landed on its fuselage after the wheels failed to deploy.
 6 June 2007: A Sri Lankan Cargo Antonov An-12 lost engine power on the runway.
 6 March 2009: A NAL Saras aircraft prototype that had taken off from HAL Airport crashed in a field near Bidadi, killing the three-man crew of test pilots.
1 February 2019: An Indian Air Force Mirage 2000 modified by HAL on an acceptance flight crashed 500 metres outside the airport perimeter wall after an unsuccessful touch-and-go on runway 09; both pilots ejected but landed on burning wreckage and died.

References

External links 

 

Airports in Bangalore
Airports in Karnataka
Airports established in 1940
Airports disestablished in 2008
1940 establishments in India
2008 disestablishments in India
Buildings and structures in Bangalore
20th-century architecture in India